József Schunda (1818–1893) and Vencel József Schunda (19 May 1845 – 26 January 1923) were uncle and nephew and Czech-born Hungarian musical instrument makers.

József Schunda started a workshop in Pest in 1848, and his brother joined him as an apprentice in 1856, advancing to become a partner, and later the owner of the factory.  The workshop produced the first pedaled Hungarian concert cimbalom in 1874 and also redesigned a modern tárogató, a clarinet-like instrument specific to Hungary.  The workshop was closed in World War II.

External links 
 Hungarian Museum of Music History, Schunda Pedal-cimbalom
 Tárogató
 Musikinstrumente & Design, Onlinemuseum

Schunda, Jozsef